The WCPW Lightweight Championship was a professional wrestling lightweight title in Windy City Pro Wrestling (WCPW). It was a secondary title for the promotion before the creation of the WCPW League Championship in 1993 and its incorporation into the then newly created weight-class division as a legitimate lightweight title (up to 210 lbs).

The inaugural champion was Mike Anthony, who defeated Trevor Blanchard in Chicago, Illinois on April 12, 1991 to become the first WCW Lightweight Champion. V-Factor holds the record for most reigns, with two. At 755 days, Anthony's first and only reign is the longest in the title's history. Evan Money's reign was the shortest in the history of the title as he lost it to The Mizfit a mere 14 days after having won the belt. Overall, there have been 25 reigns shared between 24 wrestlers, with four vacancies, and 1 deactivation.

Title history
Key

Names

Reigns

List of combined reigns

Footnotes

References

External links
WindyCityProWrestling.com
Title History - Windy City Pro Wrestling

Lightweight Championship
Lightweight wrestling championships